The women's doubles badminton event at the 2015 Pan American Games will be held from July 11–16 at the Atos Markham Pan Am Centre in Toronto. The defending Pan American Games champions are Alex Bruce and Michelle Li of Canada.

The athletes will be drawn into an elimination stage draw. Once a team lost a match, it will be not longer able to compete. Each match will be contested as the best of three games of 21 points.

Schedule
All times are Central Standard Time (UTC-6).

Seeds

Results

Finals

Top half

Bottom half

References

 Women's doubles draw with results

Women's doubles
Pan